Donald Evans (born 1946) is 34th United States Secretary of Commerce.

Donald Evans may also refer to:

Don Evans (Donald Thomas Evans, 1938–2003), playwright, educator
Donald Evans (artist) (1945–1977), American artist
Donald Evans (American poet) (1884–1921), American poet, publisher, music critic and journalist
Donald Evans (Welsh poet) (born 1940), Welsh poet, who writes in the Welsh language
Donald Evans (American football) (born 1964), former American football defensive end
Donald Randell Evans (1912–1975), Royal Air Force air chief marshal
Donald W. Evans Jr. (1943–1967), American soldier and Medal of Honor recipient
Donald Leroy Evans (1957–1999), American serial killer
Donald Evans, birth name of Ean Evans (1960–2009), American musician
Donald D. Evans (1927–2018), Canadian educator, psychotherapist and spiritual counsellor